This is a list of venues used at the Edinburgh Festival Fringe, the world's largest arts festival, which takes place in Edinburgh, Scotland each August. Many venues are known by different names during the rest of the year. For the purposes of this list they are given their "Fringe" name. Venues in italics were not in use during the last edition of the Fringe, but were used in previous years.

The big four

Four venues have multiple performance spaces (sometimes in different locations) and put on a large number of shows each festival. They are known as the big four

Assembly Hall
Gilded Balloon
Pleasance
Underbelly

List of venues

References

Venues list
Edinburgh-related lists